Mano Murthy is an Indian musician and composer in the Kannada film industry. His is best known for his songs in Mungaru Male, one of the biggest hits in the Kannada industry.

Before moving onto becoming a composer, he was an entrepreneur, having co-founded three companies in California. He was a programmer in Microsoft. His latest venture, an IP security provider called Allegro Systems, was acquired by Cisco Systems.

 He has judged many reality shows such as Fresh Voice of Karnataka, Saagardaache Sapthaswara and others.

Early life and education

Murthy had nurtured deep interest in music since a young age. He used to play drums when he was an undergrad electrical engineering student at UVCE, Bangalore University. He went to the US for graduate studies at the University of California, Davis and Stanford University.

Film career

He started his music career with composing music for the movie America! America! directed by Nagathihalli Chandrashekhar. The songs of this movie became popular, most notable being the songs America America and  Nooru Janmaku.  
He went on to compose music for the movie Nanna Preethiya Hudugi. The song Car Car of this movie was a big hit. He also composed the Music for National award-winning Movie Preethi Prema Pranaya, and the superhit Comedy movie Jokefalls. Some of the popular songs are Gandhavathi and Naguvina Loka Idu. In spite of these hit songs, his name remained relatively unknown in Kannada filmdom. However Mungaru male which became the most successful box office hit in Kannada film industry earning Rs. 750 million brought Mano murthy into limelight. It earned him enormous popularity and critical acclaim.
Next came another super hit movie Cheluvina Chithara (2007) which gave him much more fame. The quality of music and melody in songs makes him the favourite choice by producers. He also composed music for a Hindi movie in 2005 which did not take off unfortunately.

Discography

Awards

Filmfare Award for Milana (Ninnindale song)
Filmfare Award 2006 for Best Music Director, Mungaru Male
Karnataka State Award 2006 for Best Music Director, Mungaru Male
E TV Award 2006 for Best Music Director, Mungaru Male
Sansui Shri Gandha Award 2006 for Best Music Director, Mungaru Male
Hello Gandhinagar Award 2006 for Best Music Director, Mungaru Male
Karnataka Chitrarasikara Sangha Award 2006 for Best Music Director, Mungaru Male
M.S.Ramaih Chitralaya Award 2006 for Best Music Director, Mungaru Male
Garuda Mall Award 2007 for Most Popular Music Director
South Cine Fans Award Chennai 2003–2004 for Best Music Director, Preeti Prema Pranaya
National Award 2004 for Best Movie Preeti Prema Pranaya as Producer

References

External links

Official site

Kannada film score composers
Living people
Musicians from Bangalore
Year of birth missing (living people)
Filmfare Awards South winners
University of California, Davis alumni
Stanford University alumni
University Visvesvaraya College of Engineering alumni
20th-century Indian musicians